Raymond Michael Seary (18 September 1952 – 5 December 2001) was an English professional footballer who played as a left-back.

References

External links
 Cambridge United: 1970/71 - 2004/05 at Post War English & Scottish Football League A–Z Player's Database
 Queens Park Rangers: 1946/47 – 2013/14 at Post War English & Scottish Football League A–Z Player's Database
 

1952 births
2001 deaths
Sportspeople from Slough
English footballers
Association football fullbacks
Queens Park Rangers F.C. players
Cambridge United F.C. players
King's Lynn F.C. players
English Football League players
Footballers from Berkshire